The Wapack Range, sometimes referred to as the Pack Monadnock Range, is a  range of mountains in south-central New Hampshire and adjacent Massachusetts, in the northeastern United States. The  Wapack Trail, one of the oldest interstate hiking trails in the United States, traverses it. The Wapack Range is also the northern terminus of the  Midstate Trail.

The range, composed of heavily metamorphosed schist and quartzite, is oriented north–south and is located in the towns of New Ipswich, Temple, Sharon, Peterborough, and Greenfield, New Hampshire; and in Massachusetts, the towns of Ashburnham and Ashby.

Notable peaks include, from south to north, Mount Watatic, Pratt Mountain, New Ipswich Mountain, Barrett Mountain, Kidder Mountain, Temple Mountain, Pack Monadnock and North Pack Monadnock.

Significant parcels on the Wapack Range have been conserved as state parks, state forests, or properties managed by non-profit land conservation organizations. Miller State Park, the oldest state park in New Hampshire, is located on Pack Monadnock. A defunct ski area on Temple Mountain was acquired by the state of New Hampshire in 2006 and is also slated for state park status. Windblown Ski Area, on and around Barrett Mountain, is one of the oldest operating cross country ski areas in the United States. Conservation efforts on Mount Watatic have resulted in the protection of the mountain from recent attempts to blast a communications tower road to the summit and open the mountain to housing development on the location of another former ski area. The non-profit Friends of the Wapack  have been involved in conservation of the range since 1985.

References

External links
Friends of the Wapack

Mountain ranges of New Hampshire
Mountain ranges of Massachusetts
Mountains of Middlesex County, Massachusetts
Mountains of Worcester County, Massachusetts